The 2017–18 Argentine Primera División - Superliga Argentina (officially the Superliga Quilmes Clásica for sponsorship reasons) was the 128 season of top-flight professional football in Argentina. The season began on 25 August 2017 and ended on 14 May 2018.

For the first time since 1893, the AFA did not organise the championship, now being administrated by the Superliga Argentina de Fútbol.

Twenty-eight teams competed in the league, twenty-six returning from the 2016–17 season and two promoted from the 2016–17 Primera B Nacional (Argentinos Juniors and Chacarita Juniors). Four teams (Aldosivi, Atlético de Rafaela, Quilmes and Sarmiento) were relegated to the Primera B Nacional Championship in the previous tournament.

Boca Juniors, who were the defending champions, won their thirty-third league title with one match to spare after a 2–2 draw against Gimnasia y Esgrima (LP) on 9 May 2018. As a result, Boca Juniors qualified for both the 2019 Copa Libertadores and the 2018 Supercopa Argentina.

Competition format 
The tournament was contested by 28 teams. Each team played the other 27 teams in a single round-robin tournament. The additional match against the main rival team in the so-called "Fecha de Clásicos" was not played in this season.

Club information

Stadia and locations

Personnel

Managerial changes 

Interim Managers
1.  Néstor Apuzzo was interim manager in the 2017 Copa Sudamericana second stage first leg.
2.  Leandro Benítez was interim manager in the 4th round.
3. Interim manager, but later promoted to manager.
4.  Manuel Fernández was interim manager in the 5th round and the 2016–17 Copa Argentina round of 16.
5.  Marcelo Gómez was interim manager in the 9th–12th rounds.
6.  Juan Ramón Fleita was interim manager in the 11th and 12th rounds.
7.  Luis Marabotto was interim manager in the 12th round.
8.  Fabián Garfagnoli was interim manager in the 17th and 18th rounds.
9. Interim manager until the end of the tournament.
10. Interim manager in the 26th and 27th rounds and the 2018 Copa Sudamericana first stage second leg.

Foreign players

Players holding Argentinian dual nationality

 Lucas Barrios (Argentinos Juniors)
 Dylan Gissi (Defensa y Justicia)
 David Depetris (Olimpo)
 Camilo Mayada (River Plate)
 Rodrigo Mora (River Plate)
 Marcelo Larrondo (River Plate)
 Néstor Ortigoza (Rosario Central)
 Joel Soñora (Talleres (C))

League table

Results 
Teams played every other team once (either at home or away) completing a total of 27 rounds.

Season statistics

Top goalscorers 

Source: AFA

Top assists

Source: AFA

Relegation
Relegation at the end of the season is based on coefficients, which take into consideration the points obtained by the clubs during the present season and the three previous seasons (only seasons at the top-flight are counted). The total tally is then divided by the total number of games played in the top flight on those four seasons and an average is calculated. The four teams with the worst average at the end of the season were relegated to the Primera B Nacional.

Source: AFA

Awards
The following players were rewarded for their performances during the season.

Best goalkeeper:  Franco Armani (River Plate)
Best defender:  Alejandro Donatti (Racing)
Best midfielder:  Pablo Guiñazú (Talleres (C))
Best forward:  Santiago García (Godoy Cruz)
Best save:  Gonzalo Rehak (Independiente) against Racing
Best goal:  Edwin Cardona (Boca Juniors) against River Plate
Best coach:  Frank Darío Kudelka (Talleres (C))
Best player:  Cristian Pavón (Boca Juniors)
Topscorer:  Santiago García (Godoy Cruz)
Honorary Award:  Daniel Montenegro (Huracán)
Breakthrough player:  Lautaro Martínez (Racing)

See also
2017–18 Primera B Nacional
2016–17 Copa Argentina
2017–18 Copa Argentina

References

External links
 AFA - SITIO OFICIAL

Argentine Primera División seasons
2017–18 in Argentine football leagues